Noel Edward Mills (13 January 1944 – 8 December 2004) was a New Zealand rower who won an Olympic silver medal at 1972 Summer Olympics in Munich, Germany.

Mills was born in 1944 in Auckland, New Zealand. He teamed with Dick Tonks, Dudley Storey and Ross Collinge to win the silver medal in the Coxless four at the 1972 Olympics in Munich, Germany. In the following year, he won a silver medal at the European Rowing Championships in Moscow, Soviet Union, in the men's pair with Wybo Veldman. He won a bronze medal in the coxed eight at the 1978 World Rowing Championships at Lake Karapiro, New Zealand. After retiring from international rowing, Mills coached at his Whakatane Rowing Club for many years. He moved to Brisbane, Australia in the late 1990s and worked in a property development company with his nephew.

Mills died on 8 December 2004.

References

1944 births
2004 deaths
New Zealand male rowers
Olympic rowers of New Zealand
Olympic silver medalists for New Zealand
Rowers at the 1972 Summer Olympics
Rowers from Auckland
Olympic medalists in rowing
Medalists at the 1972 Summer Olympics
World Rowing Championships medalists for New Zealand
European Rowing Championships medalists